Meledonus is a genus of flies in the family Tachinidae.

Species
Meledonus albiceps Reinhard, 1956
Meledonus californicus (Coquillett, 1895)
Meledonus latipennis Aldrich, 1926
Meledonus lindensis Reinhard, 1953
Meledonus lucinus (Reinhard, 1959)

References

Dexiinae
Tachinidae genera
Diptera of North America
Taxa named by John Merton Aldrich